was a Japanese samurai of the Sengoku period, who served the Hatakeyama clan. On the occasion of the Siege of Nanao castle, His family was almost all killed by Usa clan including his father Chō Tsugutsura in the Nanao Castle.

References

Samurai
1540 births
1577 deaths
Hatakeyama clan